Kutus is a town in Kirinyaga County, Kenya.

Geography
Kutus (Kirinyaga county headquarters) forms a local authority together with another township, Kerugoya. It is known as Kerugoya/Kutus municipality. The municipality has a population of 39,441, of whom 14,056 are classified urban.  (1999 census ).

The municipality has six wards: Kerugoya Central, Kerugoya North, Kerugoya South, Kutus South, Kutus Central and Nduini. Most of these wards belong to Kerugoya/Kutus Constituency (aka Kirinyaga Central Constituency).

Etymology 
The original word for this town (Used by many people to-date) was Mucakuthi. The founding chief's name was Gutu (Kikuyu word for Ear). This location was named Gutu's which later with effort of the Gichugu Dialect changed to the modern Kutus. This is to go in line with the English show of possession by 's. Thus Kutus- belonging to Gutu. The English version would have been Gutu's.

References 

Populated places in Kirinyaga County
County capitals in Kenya